George Sherwood Eddy (1871–1963) was a leading American Protestant missionary, administrator and educator. He was a prolific author and indefatigable traveler. His main achievement was to link and finance networks of intellectuals across the globe, especially Christian leaders in Asia and the Middle East. He enabled missionaries to better understand and even think like the people they were serving. His long-term impact on the Protestant communities in the United States, and in the Third World, was long lasting. From the 1930s onwards, he became a Christian socialist.

Biography

Early life and family 
George Sherwood Eddy was born on January 19, 1871, to George Alfred Eddy and Margaret Louise Norton at Leavenworth, Kansas.  His father George Eddy was a leading businessman and civic leader; he and his wife Margaret were of Yankee stock, The son attended Phillips Andover Academy, and graduated Yale College in engineering in 1891. Eddy married Alice Maud Harriet Arden (1873–1945) on November 10, 1898.  They were the parents of two children, Margaret and Arden.  After his first wife's death, he married Catherine Louise Gates in 1946.

Career

Eddy had had a religious experience in 1889 at the Northfield conference. Therefore, after completing his engineering training he attended Union Theological Seminary (1891-1893) in New York. He also enlisted in the Student Volunteer Movement, which sought to "evangelize the world in this generation" and worked on the staff of a local Young Men's Christian Association (YMCA). In 1893-1894 he served as a traveling secretary for the Student Volunteer Movement in the United States. Eddy's father died in 1894, leaving him an inheritance that made him financially independent and enabled him to work for the causes he believed in without concern for finances. He then attended Princeton Theological Seminary, from which he graduated in 1896. In spite of his theology studies he always kept to his line to serve as a committed layman and a missionary.

Eddy was one of the first of sixteen thousand student volunteers who emerged from the leading universities of the U.S. and Europe to serve as Christian missionaries across the world. In 1896, he went to India and worked at the YMCA-organized Indian Student Volunteer Movement. He served as its secretary for the next 15 years. In 1897, Eddy took a ship from Madras to Calcutta where he met and debated Swami Vivekananda on Christianity and Hinduism. Whilst in India, Eddy attempted to convert Hindus to Christianity and in order not to offend the high caste Hindus he converted to vegetarianism.

Working among the poor and outcasts of India he mastered the Tamil language and served as a traveling evangelist among the students and masses of southern India beginning in Palamcottah.  In 1911, he was appointed secretary for Asia by the International Committee and he divided his time between evangelistic campaigns in Asia and fund-raising in North America. He spent the next 15 years doing student evangelistic work across Asia - from China, Japan, and the Philippines, through the Near East to Turkey, Palestine, Iraq, Egypt, and then to czarist Russia and made 15 trips to the Soviet Russia.  He admired the Soviet system and refused to believe reports of famine; in 1937 he agreed that the victims of Stalin's show trials were traitors as charged.  His was criticized as a  "fellow traveler." 

From 1915 to 1917, he was itinerant secretary of the YMCAs with the British and American armed forces in France. In 1916, he received two honorary degrees, one from Wooster College and the other from Yale University. From 1921 to 1957, he conducted training courses for religious, political and business leaders in England and America; he addressed 1500 American leaders. He is also known today for his works with the Oxford Group evangelical group, a predecessor to Alcoholics Anonymous.

After the YMCA and end of life 

In 1931, Sherwood Eddy stopped his career with the YMCA where he had spent 35 years as a volunteer. He had become a member of the Fellowship of Socialist Christians which was organized in the early 1930s by Reinhold Niebuhr and others on the left.  Later it changed its name to Frontier Fellowship and then to Christian Action. The main supporters of the Fellowship in the early days included Eddy, Eduard Heimann, Paul Tillich and Rose Terlin.  In its early days the group thought capitalist individualism was incompatible with Christian ethics.  Although not under Communist control, the group acknowledged Karl Marx's social philosophy.

In 1936, he founded and led with Reverend Sam H. Franklin the Delta and Providence Cooperative Farms in Bolivar County, Mississippi, and Holmes County, Mississippi, in 1939, respectively. The farms helped southern sharecroppers out of their economic plight (caused in part by side effects of the New Deal's Agricultural Adjustment Administration). Eddy drew considerable support from his friend, the theologian Reinhold Niebuhr, who once called the farms "the most significant experiment in social Christianity now being conducted in America."

These cooperatives were organized around four principles: efficiency of production and finance through the cooperative principle, participation in the construction of an economy of socialized abundance, interracial justice and realistic religion as a social dynamic. Because of its principles of economic equality between races, the cooperative paid all its members equal pay for equal work. Activities included cotton growing, cattle breeding, a pasteurization plant and a sawmill. Co-operatives also provided a variety of services to their members and surrounding communities, including a co-op store, a credit union, a medical clinic, educational programs, a library, religious services and summer student camps. Due to the tense political climate of the 1950s and poor cotton prices and sales volumes, the experiment ended around 1956 and the land was sold to the cooperative's members.

In 1949, Sherwood Eddy moved to Jacksonville, Illinois, and taught at Illinois College and MacMurray College.

He died on November 4, 1963, in Jacksonville.

Influence 

In 1897, Sherwood Eddy experienced a personal and spiritual crisis that profoundly changed his vision of missionary work. He understood that his argumentative, apologetic approach could not be very successful because it created a defensive attitude among his listeners; he wrote: "we were not sent to win debates but to win people"; he understood that the elites were not the right way in but that he had to address the ordinary people and, in 1900, he took almost two years off to learn Tamil; he understood that the local people and those who had come as missionaries had to be treated on a strictly equal footing: he was among the first to understand the aspirations of colonized peoples for self-determination and the need to appoint local leaders to lead local churches. In doing so, he anticipated by nearly 50 years, and initiated, the reflection that would lead the American Presbyterian Mission to thoroughly review its concepts, mainly after 1945.

In 1903, Sherwood Eddy founded with Anglican Bishop V.S. Azariah the first purely Indian Mission Society of Tinnevelly and in 1905 the National Missionary Society of India. Sherwood Eddy was the only non-Indian present at its founding conference in Serampore. Because of his perfect command of Tamil and his deep empathy for the Indians, he was considered one of them, which he described as one of the greatest compliments he ever received. Professor Rick Nutt considers that this initiative played a role in the emergence of Indian national sentiment. The NMS was also ecumenical as it brought together members from all Protestant churches in South India. It showed the way for churches that then also sought unity. In 1908 the South India United Church regrouped the Presbyterian and Congregationalist churches of South India, but efforts to integrate the Anglican faith into the union were unsuccessful until September 1947 when the Church of South India was created, bringing together the Anglican, Methodist, Congregationalist, Presbyterian and Reformed communities. Sherwood Eddy appears there as a pioneer of ecumenism between Protestant churches; although this had been the YMCA's policy since their inception, the merger of actual churches in India was one of the first achievements of this type ever.

From 1911 onwards, Sherwood Eddy and the YMCA missionaries led an effective evangelization in China based on the convictions and methods established in India. Missionary H. G. Lockwood noted in 1949 at a meeting with Chinese Christian leaders that the majority of them had been won to Christianity by Sherwood Eddy. Like Frank Buchman, Sherwood Eddy insisted on the need for missionaries to adopt exemplary moral behaviour.

Personal life

Eddy was celibate all his life, he also eschewed all medical care and relied on his belief in the healing powers of God. Eddy stated that he had seen God working miraculously in response to prayer. For one year he did not use his glasses as he was convinced that God would correct his eyesight.

Selected bibliography

The Awakening of India (1911)
The New Era in Asia (1913)
The Students of Asia (1915)
Suffering and the War (1916)
With Our Soldiers in France (1917)
Everybody's World (1920)

What Shall I Believe in the Light of Psychology and the New Science (1926)
The Challenge of Europe (1933). New York: Farrar & Rinehart
A Pilgrimage of Ideas: Or, The Re-education of Sherwood Eddy (1934), Autobiography.
Russia Today: What Can we Learn from It? (1934)
Revolutionary Christianity (1934)
Ten Suggestions for Personal work (1934)

God in History (1947)
You Will Survive After Death (1950)
Eighty Adventurous Years: The Autobiography of Sherwood Eddy (1955)
He wrote other works which were published in England and India.

See also
 History of religion in the United States

References

Further reading
 Dallas, Jerry.  "Eddy, George Sherwood"; American National Biography Online (2000) Access May 3, 2016.
 
 Stanley, Brian. "The Legacy of George Sherwood Eddy." International Bulletin of Missionary Research 24.3 (2000): 128-31  online
 Thompson, Michael G.  "Sherwood Eddy, the Missionary Enterprise, and the Rise of Christian Internationalism in 1920s America," Modern Intellectual History 12#1 (April 2015), 65-93.

External links
 George Sherwood Eddy archived papers at Yale University Divinity School Library Retrieved April 15, 2013
 
 
 

1871 births
1963 deaths
American male non-fiction writers
American Christian pacifists
People from Leavenworth, Kansas
20th-century American non-fiction writers
Writers from Kansas
Phillips Academy alumni
Yale College alumni
Union Theological Seminary (New York City) alumni
Princeton Theological Seminary alumni
Illinois College faculty
MacMurray College faculty
American religious writers
20th-century American male writers
YMCA leaders